Thomas Rath (born 26 July 1970 in Schwedt) is a German former professional footballer who played as a midfielder for Hertha BSC, Dynamo Dresden, SC Freiburg and VfB Leipzig.

He was a part of the East German squad at the 1989 FIFA World Youth Championship, playing two matches.

References

External links
 

1970 births
Living people
Sportspeople from Schwedt
People from Bezirk Frankfurt
German footballers
East German footballers
Footballers from Brandenburg
Association football midfielders
Germany under-21 international footballers
1. FC Frankfurt players
Hertha BSC players
Dynamo Dresden players
SC Freiburg players
1. FC Lokomotive Leipzig players
Bundesliga players
2. Bundesliga players
DDR-Oberliga players